Church Estate Almshouses are Grade II listed almshouses in Richmond, London, located on Sheen Road, near Hickey's Almshouses. Most of the buildings, which were designed by William Crawford Stow, date from 1843 but the charity that built them is known to have existed in Queen Mary I's time and may have much earlier origins.  A further eight almshouses, in addition to the original ten, were built in 1968.

The almshouses are now managed by The Richmond Charities. New residents are accepted from 65 years of age.

See also
List of almshouses in the United Kingdom

References

Further reading

External links
The Richmond Charities

1843 establishments in England
Almshouses in Richmond, London
Grade II listed almshouses
Grade II listed buildings in the London Borough of Richmond upon Thames
History of the London Borough of Richmond upon Thames
Residential buildings completed in 1843